
Gmina Milicz is an urban-rural gmina (administrative district) in Milicz County, Lower Silesian Voivodeship, in south-western Poland.

It is part of the larger Wrocław metropolitan area.

Neighbouring gminas
Gmina Milicz is bordered by the town of Sulmierzyce and the gminas of Cieszków, Jutrosin, Krośnice, Odolanów, Pakosław, Rawicz, Sośnie, Trzebnica, Zawonia, Zduny and Żmigród.

Villages
Apart from the town of Milicz, the gmina contains the villages of: 
 
 Baranowice
 Bartniki
 Borzynowo
 Brzezina Sułowska
 Czatkowice
 Duchowo
 Dunkowa
 Gądkowice
 Godnowa
 Gogołowice
 Gołkowo
 Grabówka
 Grabownica
 Gruszeczka
 Henrykowice
 Kaszowo
 Kolęda
 Łąki
 Latkowa
 Miłochowice
 Miłosławice
 Młodzianów
 Niesułowice
 Nowy Zamek
 Olsza
 Ostrowąsy
 Piękocin
 Piotrkosice
 Poradów
 Postolin
 Potasznia
 Pracze
 Ruda Milicka
 Ruda Sułowska
 Słączno
 Sławoszowice
 Stawiec
 Sulimierz
 Sułów
 Świętoszyn
 Tworzymirki
 Tworzymirki Górne
 Wałkowa
 Węgrzynów
 Wielgie Milickie
 Wilkowo
 Wodników Górny
 Wróbliniec
 Wrocławice
 Wszewilki
 Wziąchowo Małe
 Wziąchowo Wielkie

Twin towns – sister cities

Gmina Milicz is twinned with:
 Kobuleti, Georgia (2017)
 Lohr am Main, Germany (2000)

References

Milicz
Milicz County